The 1984 Liberal Party of Canada leadership election was called for June 16, 1984, to replace retiring Liberal leader and sitting Prime Minister Pierre Trudeau. The convention elected former Finance Minister John Turner, who at the time was not sitting in the House of Commons, as its leader on the second ballot, defeating another former finance minister, Jean Chrétien.

Candidates

Jean Chrétien 

Chrétien, 50, MP for Saint-Maurice since 1963, was Minister of Energy and had been Minister Responsible for constitutional negotiations, playing a significant role in the patriation of the Constitution of Canada. First appointed to Cabinet by Lester Pearson in 1967, he had served in several senior portfolios under Trudeau, including Minister of Finance and Justice Minister.
Supporters in caucus (4 MPs): Bud Cullen, Roland de Corneille, Charles Caccia, Jean-Robert Gauthier.

Don Johnston
Johnston, 47, MP for Saint-Henri—Westmount in Montreal since 1978, was President of the Treasury Board, and had served in several other economic portfolios.
Supporters in caucus (4 MPs, 1 Senator): Jack Burghardt, James Fleming, Bryce Mackasey, Raymond Savard and Sen. Gildas Molgat.

Mark MacGuigan
MacGuigan, 53, MP from Windsor-Walkerville since 1968 and a former dean of law, was the Minister of Justice and a former Minister of External Affairs.

John Munro
Munro, 53, an MP for Hamilton East since 1962, was Minister of Indian Affairs and Northern Development.

John Roberts
Roberts, 48, MP for St. Paul's, was Minister of Employment and Immigration.

John Turner
Turner, 55, former MP for Ottawa-Orleans (1968–1976) and previously for St. Lawrence—St. George, Quebec (1962–1968), had served in Cabinet under Lester Pearson and Trudeau and had been Minister of Justice and Minister of Finance until resigning from cabinet in 1975 over a policy dispute over wage and price freezes. Since then, he had been a corporate lawyer on Bay Street until his return to politics in 1984. Turner had run for the leadership previously in 1968, placing third on the final ballot.
Supporters in caucus (6 MPs): Transport Minister Lloyd Axworthy, Solicitor-General Bob Kaplan, International Trade Minister Gerald Regan, Minister of Regional Economic Expansion Ed Lumley, Minister for External Relations Jean-Luc Pépin, Minister of Consumer and Corporate Affairs Judy Erola.

Eugene Whelan
Whelan, 59, MP for Essex-Windsor since 1962, has been Minister of Agriculture from 1972 to 1979, when the Liberals lost power, and again since 1980.

Results
First ballot
TURNER, John Napier 1,593 (46%)  
CHRÉTIEN, Joseph Jacques Jean 1,067 (31%) 
JOHNSTON, Donald James 278 (8%) 
ROBERTS, John (Moody) 185
MACGUIGAN, Mark R. 135
MUNRO, John Carr 93
WHELAN, Eugene Francis 84
Spoiled ballots 2
Total votes cast 3,437

Whelan eliminated, supports Chrétien. MacGuigan withdraws and supports Turner. Munro and Roberts withdraw and support Chrétien.

Second ballot
TURNER, John Napier 1,862 (54%)
CHRÉTIEN, Joseph Jacques Jean 1,398 (40%)
JOHNSTON, Donald James 192 (6%)
Spoiled ballots	1
Total votes cast 3,453

References

1984
1984 elections in Canada
Liberal Party of Canada leadership election
June 1984 events in Canada